Eidesvik Offshore is a supply, subsea, seismic and cable-laying shipping company. The fleet consists of ten supply ships, both platform supply vessels and anchor handling tug supply vessels, five subsea vessels, five seismic vessels and one cable-laying ship. All the ships are orange in color, and most of them have names starting with Viking. The company is based in Bømlo, Norway and is listed on the Oslo Stock Exchange. Two thirds of the company is owned by Kristian Eidesvik, who also controls the short sea shipping company Wilson.

Eidesvik is notable for its part in a collaboration with Lundin Norway AS in a research and development partnership regarding the use of batteries-on-board maritime technology.

Shipping companies of Norway
Supply shipping companies
Scientific shipping companies
Companies listed on the Oslo Stock Exchange
Companies based in Hordaland
Year of establishment missing